Marta Raquel Hotus Tuki is a Rapa Nui Chilean politician, governor of Easter Island between 12 March 2014, when she was appointed by President of Chile Michelle Bachelet, and 9 September 2015, being succeeded by Melania Hotu. She has also served as municipal councilor on three occasions.

References

Living people
Governors of provinces of Chile
Rapanui politicians
Easter Island people
Women governors of provinces of Chile
1969 births